The 2013 South Dakota State Jackrabbits football team represented South Dakota State University in the 2013 NCAA Division I FCS football season. They were led by 16th year head coach John Stiegelmeier and played their home games at Coughlin–Alumni Stadium. They were a member of the Missouri Valley Football Conference. They finished the season 9–5, 5–3 in MVFC play to finish in a four way tie for second place. They received an at-large bid to the FCS playoffs where they defeated Northern Arizona in the first round before losing in the second round to Eastern Washington.

Schedule

The Dakota Marker matchup against North Dakota State set a new single-game home attendance record (16,498).

Ranking movements

References

South Dakota State
South Dakota State Jackrabbits football seasons
South Dakota State
South Dakota State Jackrabbits football